91P/Russell, also known as Russell 3, is a periodic comet in the Solar System. It was discovered by   Kenneth S. Russell in 1983.

References

External links 
 Orbital simulation from JPL (Java) / Horizons Ephemeris
 91P/Russell 3 – Seiichi Yoshida @ aerith.net
 91P at Kronk's Cometography

Periodic comets
0091
091P
Comets in 2013
19830614